Sebastián Ariel Lomonaco (born 17 September 1998) is an Argentine professional footballer who plays as a forward for Arsenal de Sarandí on loan from Godoy Cruz.

Club career
Lomonaco started his professional career in 2016, making his professional debut on 18 December for Arsenal de Sarandí in a Primera División match against Vélez Sarsfield. He scored the first goal of his career in a defeat to Olimpo on 23 February 2018. In June 2019, after seven goals in thirty-six fixtures for Arsenal de Sarandí, Lomonaco agreed a move to Godoy Cruz.

To get some more playing time, Lomonaco was loaned out to his former club, Arsenal de Sarandí, in January 2022 until the end of the year.

International career
Lomonaco was called up by the Argentina U23s for the 2019 Pan American Games in Peru. He netted a goal in the groups versus Panama on 4 August. Lomonaco appeared four times as they won the tournament.

Career statistics
.

Honours
Argentina U23
Pan American Games: 2019

References

External links

1998 births
Living people
Sportspeople from Avellaneda
Argentine footballers
Argentina youth international footballers
Footballers at the 2019 Pan American Games
Pan American Games gold medalists for Argentina
Pan American Games medalists in football
Association football forwards
Argentine Primera División players
Primera Nacional players
Arsenal de Sarandí footballers
Godoy Cruz Antonio Tomba footballers
Medalists at the 2019 Pan American Games